Star Wars: The Vintage Collection is a Star Wars basic action figures toy line produced by the Hasbro company, and released under their "Kenner" brand. The line features modern 'super-articulated' figures in product packaging nearly identical to that of the original Kenner toy series marketed from 1978 until 1984. The Vintage Collection started in the summer of 2010 and continued with new releases throughout 2012. It was preceded by limited 'vintage' style figure issues that were part of The Original Trilogy Collection (2004) and The Saga Collection (2006) lines.

Hasbro announced at San Diego Comic-Con International 2012 that The Vintage Collection would go on hiatus for two years (its return to coincide with the 3-D re-releases of the original Star Wars Trilogy starting in 2015), however, that schedule fell in flux due to the planned release of The Force Awakens in 2015, and the line was discontinued.

At Star Wars Celebration Orlando 2017, it was revealed that the line would make a comeback for 2018. The first figure revealed for the lineup was Rey from Star Wars: The Force Awakens. In May 2017, it was announced that Doctor Aphra from Marvel's Darth Vader comic book had won a fan poll to be included in the line as well.

The toyline officially made its return on April 13, 2018.

The Original Trilogy Collection

The Saga Collection

The Vintage Collection
"Wave" column denotes wave of original release. Some figures were re-released with later waves. The Sandtrooper figure was released as both VC014 and VC112.

The Vintage Collection Fan Favorites
To be released February 2013.

Exclusive Releases

Revenge of the Jedi Set
San Diego Comic Con 2011 exclusive. 14 characters from "Return of the Jedi" on a card with the original logo for the movie: "Revenge of the Jedi". Figures were packaged in a flat circular Death Star package. 6 of the figures were new releases to the Vintage Collection (the Han in Trenchcoat figure being a Vintage Collection rerelease of the Saga Collection figure), 7 of the figures were variants due to the new card, and the Rebel Trooper figure was an African American variant of the original. All figures were released as Wave 7 except for Salacious Crumb and Mouse Droid mini card figures which were exclusive to this set (although they were given VC numbers). The Mouse Droid was also released as an accessory with the Grand Moff Tarkin figure.

Carbonite Chamber Pack
San Diego Comic Con 2012 exclusive. 6 Figures (1 from each movie of the Star Wars series) in a pack surrounding the Jar Jar Binks in Carbonite figure. The 6 figures were released on a never before seen card style—the so-called Kenner 'Lost Line' packaging—that was apparently considered for the original series release in 1978. The "Jar Jar Binks (in Carbonite)" figure appeared on a standard 'vintage collection' style card (with the Phantom Menace logo on it). All six regular figures were also released at retail on regular vintage style cards as wave 14. The Jar Jar Binks in Carbonite was never released in stores, nor assigned a "VC" number.

References

Vintage Collection
Action figures